The Cherokee Shale is a geologic formation in Kansas. It preserves fossils dating back to the Carboniferous period.

See also

 List of fossiliferous stratigraphic units in Kansas
 Paleontology in Kansas

References
 

Carboniferous Missouri
Carboniferous Kansas
Carboniferous geology of Oklahoma
Carboniferous southern paleotropical deposits